Australiana is a studio album released by Australian country music singer Slim Dusty in August 1974. The album peaked at number 96 on the Kent Music Report.

The album won Album of the Year at the 1975 Country Music Awards of Australia.

Track listing
LP/Cassette

Weekly charts

Release history

References

Slim Dusty albums
1974 albums
EMI Records albums
Albums produced by Peter Dawkins (musician)